is a national highway connecting Obihiro, Hokkaido and  Urakawa, Hokkaido in Japan.

Route description
Length: 
Origin: Obihiro, Hokkaido
Terminus: Urakawa, Hokkaido (Terminates at junction with Route 235 and National Route 336 
Major cities: Obihiro, Hokkaido

History
18 May 1953: Second Class National Highway 236 from Obihiro to Urakawa
1 April 1965: First Class National Highway 236

Passes through
Hokkaido
Tokachi Subprefecture
Obihiro, Hokkaido
Kasai District, Hokkaido
 Nakasatsunai, Hokkaido
 Sarabetsu, Hokkaido
Nakagawa (Tokachi) District, Hokkaido
 Makubetsu, Hokkaido
Hiroo District, Hokkaido
 Taiki, Hokkaido
 Hiroo, Hokkaido
Hidaka Subprefecture
Urakawa District, Hokkaido
 Urakawa, Hokkaido

Intersects with

Hokkaido
Tokachi Subprefecture
National Route 38 and National Route 241
Hokkaido Highway 151
Hokkaido Highway 1084
Hokkaido Highway 1153
Hokkaido Highway 214
Hokkaido Highway 595
Hokkaido Highway 62
Hokkaido Highway 419
Hokkaido Highway 321
Hokkaido Highway 55
Hokkaido Highway 55
Hokkaido Highway 470
Hokkaido Highway 210
Hokkaido Highway 210
Hokkaido Highway 238
Hokkaido Highway 15
Hokkaido Highway 319
Hokkaido Highway 657
Hokkaido Highway 55
Hokkaido Highway 55
Hokkaido Highway 773
Hokkaido Highway 501
Hokkaido Highway 622
National Route 336
National Route 336
Hokkaido Highway 987
Hidaka Subprefecture
Hokkaido Highway 746
Hokkaido Highway 1025
National Route 336 and National Route 235

References
  Japanese Wikipedia article

236
Roads in Hokkaido